Town of district significance is an administrative division of a district in a federal subject of Russia. It is equal in status to a selsoviet or an urban-type settlement of district significance, but is organized around a town (as opposed to a rural locality or an urban-type settlement); often with surrounding rural territories.

Background
Prior to the adoption of the 1993 Constitution of Russia, this type of administrative division was defined on the whole territory of the Russian SFSR as an inhabited locality which serves as a cultural and an industrial center of a district and has a population of at least 12,000, of which at least 80% are workers, public servants, and the members of their families. After the adoption of the 1993 Constitution, the administrative-territorial structure of the federal subjects is no longer identified as the responsibility of the federal government or as the joint responsibility of the federal government and the federal subjects. This state of the matters is traditionally interpreted by the governments of the federal subjects as a sign that the matters of the administrative-territorial divisions are the sole responsibility of the federal subjects themselves. As a result, the modern administrative-territorial structures of the federal subjects vary significantly from one federal subject to another; that includes the manner in which the towns of district significance are organized and the choice of a term to refer to such entities.

As an administrative division
As of 2013, the following types of such entities are recognized:
District town: in Krasnoyarsk Krai
Settlement municipal formation: in Leningrad Oblast
Town: in the Republic of Buryatia, the Republic of Kalmykia, and the Sakha Republic; in Krasnodar and Stavropol Krais; in Chelyabinsk, Ivanovo, Kirov, Moscow, Murmansk, and Novosibirsk Oblasts
Town administration: in the Chechen Republic
Town of district significance: in the Mari El Republic, the Republic of Mordovia, the Republic of Tatarstan, and the Udmurt Republic; in Altai Krai; in Arkhangelsk, Astrakhan, Kaliningrad, Kemerovo, Kostroma, Kursk, Nizhny Novgorod, Novgorod, Oryol, Penza, Ryazan, Tambov, Ulyanovsk, Volgograd, Vologda, and Yaroslavl Oblasts
Town of district significance administrative territory: in the Komi Republic
Town under district jurisdiction: in the Republic of North Ossetia–Alania; in Kurgan, Lipetsk, and Tula Oblasts
Town under district jurisdiction (urban settlement) (: in the Tyva Republic
Urban administrative okrug: in Bryansk Oblast
Urban settlement: in the Chuvash Republic and the Republic of North Ossetia–Alania; in Amur, Rostov, Smolensk, and Voronezh Oblasts

As an inhabited locality
Some federal subjects of Russia, for example the Sakha Republic, also use the term "town of district significance" to refer to a type of an urban locality instead of an administrative division. Confusingly, the Sakha Republic uses the term "town" to refer to a type of an administrative division.

References

Sources
 

Administrative divisions of Russia
Cities by type